Amorino may refer to:

Amorino (gelato), an Italian gelato company
Amorino (album), a 2003 album by Isobel Campbell
Amorino (plural amorini), a putto representing a cupid

See also
 Amorina (disambiguation)